Nikulino is a rural locality (a village) in Kubenskoye Rural Settlement, Vologodsky District, Vologda Oblast, Russia. The population was 1 as of 2002.

Geography 
The distance to Vologda is 73 km, to Kubenskoye is 27 km. Yefimovo is the nearest rural locality.

References 

Rural localities in Vologodsky District